Władysław Skoczylas (4 April 1883, Wieliczka – 8 April 1934, Warsaw) was a Polish watercolorist, woodcutter, sculptor and art teacher.

Biography 
His father was a foreman in the salt mines. He graduated from the gymnasium in Bochnia, then attended the Kraków Academy of Fine Arts, where he studied painting with Teodor Axentowicz and Leon Wyczółkowski and sculpture with Konstanty Laszczka. He had to give up oil painting and focus on watercolors, due to an allergy that caused a rash on his hands.

For two years, he taught drawing at the "" in Zakopane then, from 1910 to 1913, he continued his sculptural studies in Paris with Antoine Bourdelle, followed by classes in woodcutting at the Hochschule für Grafik und Buchkunst in Leipzig.

In 1914, his woodcuts won an award at the second Henryk Grohman Competition. After the war, he became a Professor at the Warsaw University of Technology and obtained the chair of graphics at the School of Fine Art in 1922. In the Art competitions at the 1928 Olympics in Amsterdam, he was awarded a bronze medal for watercolors on the subject of archery.

During the 1920s, he was co-founder of several groups devoted to the promotion of Polish art and provided illustrations for numerous periodicals. In 1929, he was awarded the Order of Polonia Restituta. From 1930 to 1931, he was Director of the Department of Art at the Ministry of Religious Affairs.

The largest collection of his works and personal memorabilia is currently held at the Kraków Saltworks Museum in Wieliczka. Streets have been named after him in Bochnia, Częstochowa, Wrocław and Warsaw.

Selected works

References

Further reading 
 Stanisław Woźnicki, Władysław Skoczylas, Gebethnera i Wolffa, 1925.
 Maria Grońska, Władysław Skoczylas, Ossolineum, 1966.
 Ewa Liszka and Maryla Sitkowska, Władysław Skoczylas – mistrz Pawła Stellera, Muzeum Historia Katowic, 2014

External links 

ArtNet: More works by Skoczylas.

1883 births
1934 deaths
20th-century Polish painters
20th-century Polish male artists
Olympic bronze medalists in art competitions
Polish watercolourists
Woodcut designers
Recipients of the Order of Polonia Restituta
People from Wieliczka
Medalists at the 1928 Summer Olympics
20th-century printmakers
Hochschule für Grafik und Buchkunst Leipzig alumni
Olympic competitors in art competitions
Polish male painters